DZEA (909 AM) Radyo Totoo is a station owned and operated by the Roman Catholic Diocese of Laoag. The station's studio and transmitter are located at the Bishop's Residence, P. Gomez St., Laoag, Ilocos Norte.

References

News and talk radio stations in the Philippines
Radio stations established in 1991
Radio stations in Ilocos Norte